

Discography

Albums
as part of Carte de Séjour

Solo Studio Albums

Compilation Albums

Other Albums

Singles
as part of Carte de Séjour

Solo

Videography
as part of Carte De Séjour
1984: Bleu De Marseille  
1987: Douce France
Solo
1991: Barbès
1993: Voilà, Voilà 
1993: Indie 
1995: Non Non Non
1995: Indie (1+1+1)
1997: Ya Rayah
1998: Ida
1999: 1,2,3 Soleils
2000: Hey Anta
2001: Rachid Taha En Concert Live Paris 
2004: Tékitoi
2004: Rock El Casbah  
2006: Écoute-Moi Camarade 
2006: Agatha 
2007: Ma Parabole D'Honneur 
2009: Bonjour
2012: Voilà, Voilà
2013: Now or Never (feat. Jeanne Added)
2019: Je suis africain

References 

Rachid Taha albums